Delicate Flame of Desire is the third studio album by progressive rock band Karnataka, released by Immrama Records on February 10, 2003. It was the final Karnataka album to feature all five of the original band members, as bassist Ian Jones was the only remaining founding member left by the time The Gathering Light, the band's fourth album, was released.

Track listing
All lyrics written by R. Jones.

 "Karnataka" (Instrumental) (J. Edwards/I. Jones) - 2:54
 "Time Stands Still" (P. Davies/J. Edwards/I. Jones/R. Jones) - 6:17
 "Delicate Flame of Desire" (J. Edwards/I. Jones/R. Jones) - 7:34
 "After the Rain" (J. Edwards/I. Jones/R. Jones) - 7:52
 "Strange Behaviour" (J. Edwards/I. Jones/R. Jones) - 6:10
 "The Right Time" (P. Davies/J. Edwards/I. Jones/R. Jones) - 7:06
 "One Breath Away" (I. Jones/R. Jones) - 5:13
 "Out of Reach" (I. Jones/R. Jones) - 7:48
 "Heart of Stone" (J. Edwards/I. Jones/R. Jones) - 10:31

Personnel
Rachel Jones - lead vocals, percussion
Paul Davies - electric guitars
Ian Jones - bass, acoustic guitars, percussion, vocals
Jonathan Edwards - keyboards, backing vocals
Gavin Griffiths - drums, percussion
Anne-Marie Helder - flute, percussion, backing vocals

Additional personnel
Steve Evans - programming
Heather Findlay - vocals (2, 6, and 9)

References

2003 albums
Karnataka (band) albums